The ORACLE or Oak Ridge Automatic Computer and Logical Engine, an early computer built by Oak Ridge National Laboratory, was based on the IAS architecture developed by John von Neumann.

Summary 

The Oak Ridge National Laboratory Review states:
[Oak Ridge National] Laboratory engineers assisted Argonne [National Laboratory] during the early 1950s in design and fabrication of the Oak Ridge Automatic Computer and Logical Engine. Its name was selected with reference to a lyrical acronym from Greek mythology—ORACLE, defined as 'a shrine in which a deity reveals hidden knowledge.'

Assembled before the development of transistors and microchips, the ORACLE was a large scientific digital computer that used vacuum tubes. It had an original storage capacity of 1024 words of 40 bits each (later doubled to 2048 words). The computer also contained a magnetic-tape auxiliary memory and an on-line cathode-tube plotter, a recorder, and a typewriter. Operational in 1954, for a time the ORACLE had the fastest speed and largest data storage capacity of any computer in the world. Problems that would have required two mathematicians with electric calculators three years to solve could be done on the ORACLE in 20 minutes.

[Alston] Householder and the Mathematics Panel used the ORACLE to analyze radiation and shielding problems. In 1957, Hezz Stringfield and Ward Foster, both of the Budget Office, also adopted the ORACLE for more mundane but equally important tasks—annual budgeting and monthly financial accounting. As one of the last 'homemade computers,' the ORACLE became obsolete by the 1960s. The Laboratory then purchased or leased its mainframe computers from commercial suppliers. From the initial applications of the ORACLE to nuclear aircraft problems, computer enthusiasm spread like lightning throughout the Laboratory, and in time, use of the machines became common in all the Laboratory's divisions.

ORACLE was operational (passed acceptance test) in 1953, and replaced the USAF-Fairchild Computer (or "SPEC" - Special Purpose Electronic Computer).

As with all computers of its era, the ORACLE computer was a one-of-a-kind machine that could not exchange programs with other computers (even other IAS machines).  It used vacuum tubes, transistors, and diodes.  It used a Williams tube for 2048 words of memory.  Its addition time was 70 microseconds, the multiplication time was 370-590 microseconds, and the division time was 590 microseconds.  These times include the storage access time, which was about 62 microseconds.

The ORACLE pre-dated input from disks and the use of punch cards with computers; it used paper tape for input and breakage of the tape was a frequent problem.

References

External links
 BRL 1961 report

IAS architecture computers
Oak Ridge National Laboratory